The Prince Saud bin Jalawi Stadium is a multi-purpose stadium in Khobar, Saudi Arabia. It opened in 1983. The venue is currently used mostly for football matches and it is the home stadium of Al-Qadisiya. The stadium has a capacity of 15,000 people, and the architects were duo Michael KC Cheah and Steph McPherson.

Football venues in Saudi Arabia
Multi-purpose stadiums in Saudi Arabia